Didier Notheaux (4 February 1948 – 18 August 2021) was a French football player and coach.

Prior to his coaching career, he played mainly for FC Rouen, RC Lens and Rennes. He then coached numerous French clubs and already had a brief stint for Burkina Faso. He led the team to 2000 African Cup of Nations, but was fired just before the tournament. He came back in Africa in 2007.

References

External links
 Didier Notheaux Interview

1948 births
2021 deaths
People from Déville-lès-Rouen
Sportspeople from Seine-Maritime
French footballers
Association football defenders
Ligue 1 players
RC Lens players
Stade Rennais F.C. players
FC Rouen players
French football managers
Burkina Faso national football team managers
Ligue 1 managers
Le Havre AC managers
FC Mulhouse managers
Stade de Reims managers
Stade Rennais F.C. managers
FC Sochaux-Montbéliard managers
ASOA Valence managers
French expatriate sportspeople in Benin
French expatriate sportspeople in Burkina Faso
Footballers from Normandy